This Christmas Day is the fifth studio album and first official Christmas album by English singer Jessie J, released by Republic Records on 26 October 2018. The album, a follow-up to her four-part fourth studio album R.O.S.E. which had been released earlier that year, marked the singer's first Christmas album. Recording took place, at short notice, in both Europe and Los Angeles in August 2018. This Christmas Day consists of eleven tracks, featuring ten cover versions of Christmas standards and carols, two of which are duets featuring recording artists Babyface, and Boyz II Men, and one original song.

Upon release, the album earned a mixed reception from music critics who were impressed with Jessie J's vocals and the work of her team of iconic producers such as David Foster, Rodney Jerkins, and Jimmy Jam and Terry Lewis, but found that the singer was overselling and the classic material on the album lacked originality. On the charts, This Christmas Day debuted and peaked at number 48 on the US Top Holiday Albums. Its release was accompanied by a lyric video for the promotional single "This Christmas Day", penned by Jessie J.

Background and recording
In May 2018, Jessie J released her fourth studio album R.O.S.E.. Issued in four parts, consisting of the EPs Realisations, Obsessions, Sex, and Empowerment that create an acronym for R.O.S.E., the R&B-heavy album failed to chart. Throughout the summer, she embarked on the R.O.S.E. Tour, playing summer shows and festivals, but was looking for a different project "as a thank-you to fans for their support and to celebrate how great this year has been." In July 2018, Republic Records greenlit the recording of a Christmas album.

Much of the album was recorded in two weeks around the tour, in both Europe and Los Angeles. Jessie J stated that her decision to create the album was "very last minute", and that working with "classic producers" such as David Foster, Kenneth "Babyface" Edmonds, Rodney Jerkins and Jimmy Jam and Terry Lewis on the album was a "dream come true". Apart from her cover versions of Christmas standards and carols, Jessie J wrote "This Christmas Day" for the album, its only original song, produced by Jerkins. The song was inspired a friend of Jessie J who had lost her brother.

Critical reception

Allmusic editor Neil Z. Yeung called the album "a collection of faithful renditions of beloved Christmas classics. Soothing and nostalgic, the 11-song set pairs big-band glitz and jazzy swing with a '90s R&B touch [...] As Christmas albums go, This Christmas Day benefits from Jessie J's powerful vocals and inspired arrangement from her team of iconic producers. Much like Kylie Minogue's Kylie Christmas or Mariah Carey's Merry Christmas, This Christmas Day is pleasant, wintry fun for pop fans in need of updated takes on songs they already know by heart." Vulture critic Craig Jenkins felt that This Christmas Day "is solid, but it missed a chance to be cool" and added: "It might surprise you that the album these collaborations landed on is mostly a drippy collection of melismatic readings of Christmas standards."

Ben Beaumont-Thomas, writing for The Guardian, remarked that "flanked with beautifully arranged backings that emphasise the “big” in big band, you initially worry she oversells these standards [...] Every note, no matter how short, is spritzed with earnest vibrato, and also occasionally toasted with vocal fry. But if your Christmas involves a 12 ft illuminated Santa on the lawn, eggnog on the breakfast table and red glitter on everything, you will find much to love here." Connor Ratliff called This Christmas Day "jazzy and professional" but noted: "There is an aspect to a record like this that feels like it is exactly what people hate about Christmas music – the same 10 songs being modernized by 20 new artists every year, in more or less the same way."

In 2022 Billboard listed This Christmas Day as the 15th Best Christmas Albums of the 21st Century.

Commercial performance
This Christmas Day debuted and peaked at number 48 on the US Top Holiday Albums. The second track from the album, "Man with the Bag", managed to peak at number 70 on the UK Singles chart.

Track listing

Charts

Release history

References

2018 Christmas albums
Jessie J albums
Republic Records albums
Christmas albums by English artists
Contemporary R&B Christmas albums